Simen Brenne (born 17 March 1981) is a Norwegian footballer who plays for Råde.
Brenne has played in 15 games for Norway, and scored one goal since his debut in 2007.

Career statistics

International goals

Honours

Club
Fredrikstad
Norwegian Football Cup (1): 2006

Lillestrøm
Norwegian Football Cup (1): 2007

Strømsgodset
Tippeligaen (1): 2013

References

External links

 Odd Grenland profile

1981 births
Living people
Norwegian footballers
Norway international footballers
Norway under-21 international footballers
Moss FK players
Fredrikstad FK players
Lillestrøm SK players
Odds BK players
Strømsgodset Toppfotball players
Sarpsborg 08 FF players
Eliteserien players
Norwegian First Division players
Sportspeople from Fredrikstad
Association football midfielders